Sphingobacterium zeae is a Gram-negative and rod-shaped bacterium from the genus of Sphingobacterium which has been isolated from stem tissue of a mays-plant (Zea mays).

References

External links
Type strain of Sphingobacterium zeae at BacDive -  the Bacterial Diversity Metadatabase

Sphingobacteriia
Bacteria described in 2016